Ehrenfest equations (named after Paul Ehrenfest) are equations which describe changes in specific heat capacity and derivatives of specific volume in second-order phase transitions. The Clausius–Clapeyron relation does not make sense for second-order phase transitions, as both specific entropy and specific volume do not change in second-order phase transitions.

Quantitative consideration
Ehrenfest equations are the consequence of continuity of specific entropy  and specific volume , which are first derivatives of specific Gibbs free energy – in second-order phase transitions. If one considers specific entropy  as a function of temperature and pressure, then its differential is:
.
As , then the differential of specific entropy also is:

,

Due to continuity of specific entropy, the following holds in second-order phase transitions: . So,

Therefore, the first Ehrenfest equation is:

.

The second Ehrenfest equation is got in a like manner, but specific entropy is considered as a function of temperature and specific volume:

.

.

Limitations
Derivatives of Gibbs free energy are not always finite. Transitions between different magnetic states of metals can't be described by Ehrenfest equations.

See also
 Paul Ehrenfest
 Clausius–Clapeyron relation
 Phase transition

References

Thermodynamic equations